On 21 July 2017, a Boeing 737-800 belonging to and operated by Sunwing Airlines Inc. and operating as Thomson Airways Flight 1526 from Belfast International Airport and bound for Corfu, Greece with 185 people aboard, suffered a "serious incident" during takeoff, colliding with a runway approach light during departure. The incident was investigated by the Air Accidents Investigation Branch and determined to be the result of an incorrect temperature input into the aircraft's flight computer resulting in underperformance at take-off. The area beyond the runway and the terrain beyond were largely unobstructed, and the aircraft eventually climbed away undamaged.  The remainder of the flight to Corfu was uneventful. The "serious incident" at take-off was realized and reported when airport staff subsequently observed minor ground damage. The investigation report concluded that the crew could not reasonably have been expected to recognize the anomalously low speed sooner or intervene more effectively. The report listed several examples of aircraft underperformance at takeoff, reviewed the history of relevant industry efforts, and recommended that a Takeoff Acceleration Monitoring System and associated certification standards should be developed without further delay.

Aircraft 
The incident aircraft was a Boeing 737-86J(WL) serial number 38124, registration C-FWGH. The aircraft was delivered to Air Berlin in 2011 as registration D-ABMC. The aircraft entered Sunwing Airlines fleet in 2017 following the bankruptcy of Air Berlin. During the time of the incident Thomson Airways had leased the aircraft for the summer season from 29 April until 31 October 2017.

Incident details 
name=":0">

</ref>   (Both incorrect figures appeared as OATs on the flight plan: -47 °C at the first waypoint after top-of-climb, -52 °C at top-of-climb.<ref
  name=":0" />  Delays around reporting the incident meant that the Cockpit Voice Recorder information was not available for the investigation.<ref
  name=":0" />)

As the aircraft departed Runway 07, the crew noticed unusually slow acceleration as well as a low climb rate, a fact noted by witnesses on the ground. Shortly after lifting off the runway one of the aircraft's landing gear collided with a supplementary runway approach light. The light was knocked loose from its mounting and crushed while the 737 suffered no damage. Crewmembers were not made aware of the incident until ATC personnel at Belfast airport filed an incident report with the AAIB.

Analysis 
Usage of inaccurate takeoff data can be fatal, as it can lead to runway overruns and possibly collisions with obstructions, as happened in a 2004 accident at Halifax Airport in which seven people died.<ref
    name=           "  EddieSez"    >
</ref>

Neither the installed flight management computer software nor the Electronic flight bags (EFBs) in use helped in detecting the data input error.  A recent software release had not yet been installed, and the software omitted the cross-check of the pilot input data against the outside air temperature actually measured.  The pilot became aware of the aircraft's underperformance late in the take-off run but did not intervene effectively. The Report explored various human-factors aspects of the incident, concluding that the pilots could not reasonably have been expected to respond more quickly to the developing situation, either before or after becoming airborne.  It reviews and lists recent incidents of aircraft underperformance at take-off, reviews industry efforts to provide automatic warning in such situations, and calls for closer regulatory attention to pilots' portable computers ('electronic flight bags').<ref
  name=":0"/>

Relevance to aircraft systems 
This incident was included in discussions of proposed new aircraft equipment:

Extended duration of the CVR (Cockpit Voice Recorder)<ref
    name=":1"    >
</ref>
 Takeoff Performance Monitoring System (TOPMS) or Takeoff Acceleration Monitoring System (TAMS).<ref
  name=":0" /> A 2019 research paper explores the cause of this serious incident, caused by erroneous data entry. The paper "summarises a basic takeoff acceleration monitoring system and the effect this would have had on the July 2017 event".

References 

Accidents and incidents involving the Boeing 737 Next Generation
Airliner accidents and incidents caused by pilot error
Aviation accidents and incidents in Northern Ireland
June 2017 events in the United Kingdom